FC Milwaukee Torrent is an American soccer team based in Milwaukee, Wisconsin.

The club fields a men's and women's team. The men play in the National Premier Soccer League (NPSL), and the women play in the Women's Premier Soccer League (WPSL)

History
In 2015, the team was founded, playing their inaugural season in 2016.

Since 2017, the team has played their home games at Hart Park in Wauwatosa, Wisconsin.

In the spring of 2017 the team announced the addition of a women's side to start play in the WPSL beginning with the 2018 season.

On 18 December 2018, the team announced in a press conference that Carlos Córdoba would be the Milwaukee Torrent's new head coach for the 2019 season.

On March 3, 2022, the team named Steve Provan as head coach for the NPSL squad ahead of the 2022 season.

Year by Year NPSL Men

Overall NPSL Record - 26w 23l 13d

Year by Year WPSL Women

Overall WPSL Record - 17w 12d 9l

Tournaments

Honors
National Premier Soccer League
Central Conference
Champion (1): 2016, 2021
NISA Independent Cup

Midwest Region Champion: 2021

References

Notes

External links
 Official website

 
Sports in Milwaukee
Sports teams in Wisconsin
Association football clubs established in 2015
2015 establishments in Wisconsin